Mahfouda is a village at more than 600 metres above sea level in the wilayah of Béjaïa in Algeria.

Populated places in Béjaïa Province